The Minister for Environment, Biodiversity and Land Reform is a junior ministerial post in the Scottish Government. As a result, the Minister does not attend the Scottish Cabinet, but supports the Cabinet Secretary for Net Zero, Energy and Transport who attends the cabinet.

The current Minister for Environment, Biodiversity and Land Reform is Màiri McAllan.

Overview

Responsibilities 
The Minister for Environment, Biodiversity and Land Reform has specific responsibility for:

 land reform & land use
 Royal Botanic Garden
 environmental quality
 natural resources, peatland and flooding
 Scottish Land Commission
 Hydro Nation
 Drinking Water Quality Regulator
 private water
 forestry & woodlands
 Forestry and Land Scotland
 Scottish Forestry
 EU Support and related services
 Forest Research (cross-border services)
 environmental and climate justice
 Crown Estate Scotland
 marine planning
 national parks and natural heritage
 plant health
 GM
Since 2021, the Minister shares responsibility for biodiversity with the Minister for Green Skills, Circular Economy and Biodiversity.

List of office holders

See also
Scottish Parliament

References

External links 
 Minister for Rural Affairs and the Natural Environment on Scottish Government website

Rural Affairs and the Natural Environment
Environment of Scotland